The Gorbachev Peace egg is a Fabergé egg by Fabergé workmaster Victor Mayer. In 1991, Herbert Mohr-Mayer gave the Gorbachev Peace Egg to Mikhail Gorbachev, president of the former Soviet Union. It was given as a tribute to the way in which Gorbachev had succeeded in reducing tensions between East and West. Mikhail Gorbachev donated this Fabergé egg as an Easter present to the Kremlin Museum in Moscow.

The egg is made of 18Kt yellow gold and covered with transparent green vitreous enamel. The upper half of the egg opens up and reveals a golden dove.

External links
Fabergé Gorbachev Peace Egg

Fabergé eggs
Mikhail Gorbachev
1991 works